The Impossible Leap in One Hundred Simple Steps is an album by the post-rock band From Monument to Masses. It was released in 2003, and was the band's second release on Dim Mak Records. As with other albums released by the group, there are numerous television, radio and film sound clips played within tracks, ranging from clips of George W Bush, to a Morpheus speech from the film The Matrix.

Track listing
"Sharpshooter" – 8:52
Contains quotations from Noam Chomsky, in addition to various news report excerpts from September 11, 2001.
"From the Mountains to the Praries" – 8:58
Contains quotations from George W Bush, Dwight Eisenhower, Sunera Thobani, and Colonel Dax from Paths of Glory.
"The Quiet Before..." – 2:55
Contains excerpts from the film Pump Up the Volume, and a Morpheus speech in The Matrix.
"The Spice Must Flow" – 7:53
Contains quotations from Martin Luther King Jr. and Conquest of the Planet of the Apes.
"Comrades & Friends" – 4:06
Contains a quotation from Noam Chomsky.
"Old Robes" – 8:10
Contains quotations from H. Rap Brown.
"To Z (Repeat)" – 6:49
Contains quotations from Sunera Thobani and Frederick Douglass.

External links
 Official website
 MySpace page
 Dim Mak Records
 RCRD LBL page
 FMTM on YouTube

2003 albums
Dim Mak Records albums